Then & Now: The Very Best of Nik Kershaw, released in 2005, combines Nik Kershaw hits, collaborations and a few new tracks.

CD track listing

All tracks written by Nik Kershaw, except track 14 written by Jacques Lucont and Nik Kershaw

All songs produced by Nik Kershaw, except Songs 1-7 produced by Peter Collins, Songs 11-12 co-produced with Julian Mendelsohn, Song 14 produced by Jacques Lucont

DVD track listing
 "Wouldn't It Be Good"
 "I Won't Let the Sun Go Down on Me" (live version)
 "Dancing Girls"
 "Wide Boy" (full-length version)
 "Nobody Knows"
 "Human Racing"
 "Don Quixote"
 "When a Heart Beats"
 "Radio Musicola"
 "Elisabeth's Eyes"

External links
 

2005 greatest hits albums
Nik Kershaw albums
2005 video albums
Music video compilation albums